Henry Rupert Farnsworth (3 December 1885 – 8 March 1960) was an Australian rules footballer who played with Essendon and St Kilda in the Victorian Football League (VFL).

Notes

External links 

1885 births
1960 deaths
Australian rules footballers from Melbourne
Australian Rules footballers: place kick exponents
Essendon Football Club players
St Kilda Football Club players
West Melbourne Football Club players
Sturt Football Club players